The 24 Battalion was a unit of the International Brigades made up of Cuban volunteers during the Spanish Civil War. The Battalion served in the XV International Brigade and was later moved to a Spanish unit.

History
It was founded on 14 March 1937 and was formed mainly by Cuban volunteers. On 10 November 1937 it was moved to one of the Spanish mixed brigades.

References

External links
Fernando Vera Jimenez Cubans in the Spanish Civil War
List of Cubans in the Spanish Civil War

Military history of Cuba
International Brigades
Cuba–Spain relations
Military units and formations established in 1937
Military units and formations disestablished in 1938